Aleksi Niemi (born 12 April 1995) is a Finnish orienteering competitor, born in Tampere. He competed at the 2019 World Orienteering Championships in Østfold, where he placed 12th in the middle final, and won a silver medal with the Finnish relay team, along with Elias Kuukka and Miika Kirmula. He won a silver medal in sprint at the 2015 Junior World Orienteering Championships in Rauland, and a gold medal in the relay with the Finnish team.

References

1995 births
Living people
Sportspeople from Tampere
Finnish orienteers
Male orienteers
Foot orienteers
20th-century Finnish people
21st-century Finnish people
Junior World Orienteering Championships medalists